Spruell is a surname. Notable people with the surname include:
 Freddie Spruell (1893–1956), American Delta blues guitarist and singer
John Spreull also known as John Spreul and Bass John - Glasgow apothecary and businessman
 Sam Spruell, British actor
 Walter Spreull of Cowden Hall, East Renfrewshire